Kate Snow (born June 10, 1969) is an American television journalist for NBC News, serving as Senior National Correspondent to various NBC platforms, including Today, NBC Nightly News, Dateline NBC, and MSNBC. Snow also anchors the Sunday edition of NBC Nightly News, and frequently substitutes for the weekday and Saturday broadcast. Snow also previously hosted MSNBC Live.
 
Before joining NBC News in 2010, she was a co-anchor for the weekend edition of Good Morning America on ABC from 2004 to 2010. Snow had also appeared on its weekday edition and World News as a fill-in anchor and correspondent. She was also a correspondent for the now-canceled NBC newsmagazine Rock Center with Brian Williams.

Early life and education
Snow was born June 10, 1969, in Bangor, Maine, and moved with her family to Burnt Hills, New York, when she was six months old. She is a 1987 graduate of Burnt Hills-Ballston Lake High School. She graduated from Cornell University, and holds a master's in foreign service from Georgetown University.

Career
Snow joined ABC in 2003 as Good Morning Americas White House reporter before she was tapped to co-host the morning show's weekend edition. She had previously worked at NPR and NBC Radio, and also worked as a reporter at KOAT-TV in Albuquerque, New Mexico, from 1995 to 1998 and at CNN from 1998 to 2003.

During the 2008 presidential race, Snow was ABC News' correspondent covering Hillary Clinton's presidential campaign, the 2004 Democratic National Convention, and Sarah Palin's campaign for vice president.

Snow joined NBC News in 2010 as correspondent for Dateline NBC and a contributor to other NBC programming. In September 2015, Snow began anchoring the Sunday broadcast of NBC Nightly News. That same month, Snow began hosting a two-hour block on MSNBC Live. One year later, she won a News & Documentary Emmy Awards for her interview of numerous women including Andrea Constand who had accused Bill Cosby of committing sexual assault, which had aired on Dateline NBC. In April 2017, she left her anchoring duties at MSNBC to become a Senior National Correspondent at NBC News, covering various stories for NBC Nightly News, Today and Dateline NBC.

In October 2019, Snow began hosting a true-crime television series titled Relentless, which airs on Oxygen. In September 2022, Snow began co-anchoring a two-hour block of NBC News Daily, alongside Aaron Gilchrist. The first hour of the program assumed the timeslot held by Days of Our Lives (which was moved to the streaming service Peacock) and will simulcast on NBC News Now and Peacock.

Memberships

Snow is a member of the Department of Communication's advisory council at Cornell University and is on the national board of Big Brothers/Big Sisters of America.

Career timeline
 1995–1998: KOAT-TV reporter
 1998–2003: CNN reporter
 2003–2010: ABC News
 2003–2004: Good Morning America White House correspondent
 2004–2010: Good Morning America Weekend Edition co-anchor
 2010–present: NBC News
 2010–present: Dateline NBC correspondent
 2011–present: Today fill-in anchor and news anchor
 2011–2013: Rock Center with Brian Williams correspondent
 2013–present: NBC News national correspondent
 2015–2017: MSNBC Live anchor
 2015–present: NBC Nightly News Sunday anchor
 June 2017–July 2017: Sunday Night with Megyn Kelly correspondent
 September 2022–present: NBC News Daily co-anchor

Personal life
Snow is married to radio presenter Chris Bro. They have two children.

References

External links

1969 births
Living people
Walsh School of Foreign Service alumni
People from Ballston, New York
American television journalists
American people of British descent
American people of English descent
Cornell University alumni
American women television journalists
ABC News personalities
NBC News people
CNN people
MSNBC people